= Opisidae =

Scientific classification
- Domain: Eukaryota
- Kingdom: Animalia
- Phylum: Arthropoda
- Class: Malacostraca
- Order: Amphipoda
- Superfamily: Lysianassoidea
- Family: Opisidae

Family of crustaceans

Opisidae is a family of crustaceans belonging to the order Amphipoda.

Genera:

- Normanion Bonnier, 1893
- Opisa Boeck, 1876
- Podoprionell Sars, 1895
- Podoprionides Walker, 1906
